Father and Scout is a 1994 comedy film, starring Bob Saget and Brian Bonsall. The film was written by Sheldon Bull and Hoyt Hilsman and directed by Richard Michaels.

Plot 

Spencer Paley is a neurotic, sarcastic, cowardly writer from Los Angeles married to Donna and has a ten-year-old son Michael in sixth grade.

During a soccer game Michael is injured by a player on the opposing team. Knowing how important the game is to him, Donna encourages Michael to get up and go forward playing the game. However when he asks Spencer for his advice, Spencer tells him to sit out because “it’s just a stupid game.”

Although Spencer cares for his son, he is not very active and takes Michael to the movies to spend time with him. Donna tells Spencer she admires his way of bonding with Michael but feels they need to do “more manly, outdoor activities.” Spencer then agrees to be more active outdoors with Michael.

While sitting down to dinner, Donna reminds Michael to show Spencer a letter he received from his school. The letter is an invitation for a “dad and lad” weekend, a camping trip at a camp on Catalina Island.

Donna tells Spencer that all of the fathers and male students are attending the trip from Michael’s sixth grade class. Michael implies to Spencer he will be disappointed if he is the only student not to go on the trip.

Spencer reluctantly agrees to attend so he doesn’t disappoint his son, but reminds Donna that he is not the type for the outdoors or camping because Spencer’s father made him go to a summer camp in his youth which Spencer hated because he was bullied. Spencer never went camping again after.

After going through treacherous Los Angeles traffic, Spencer goes to the harbor where the fathers and their sons will depart on a 3 hour boating trip to Catalina. Spencer is then introduced to the Scoutmaster who is the leader of the camping trip, and is also Michael’s physical education teacher, and meets two fathers and their sons from Michael’s class, one being a clumsy and cowardly film editor Aaron Deutch and his disillusioned, outspoken son Brent, and Chet Johansen, a gruff and arrogant firefighter and former United States Marine, and his bratty, spoiled son Chip.

The fathers and sons arrive at nearly midnight on Friday and load their camping gear into a truck and the Scoutmaster informs them it will be a 45 minute hike to the camp at Catalina. Spencer is outraged at having to hike and makes many complaints as well as insults the Scoutmaster, embarrassing Michael in the process.

Spencer and Aaron hit it off as neither of them want to hike and Spencer asks the Scoutmaster if they can take a water taxi to the camp. The Scoutmaster informs them that the water taxis are for the girls and their mothers of the sixth grade class who are going to another nearby camp on the same weekend.

Spencer and Aaron disobey the Scoutmaster and board the water taxi with their sons. The water taxi navigator then hands Spencer his business card and says he can call him anytime if he wishes to leave camp.

The Paleys and Deutchs are the first to arrive at camp. Their tents are very run down and have holes in them.

Having barely gotten any sleep Michael and Spencer awaken the next morning and attempt to take a shower, but the faucet in the stall is broken so they skip their shower and go to breakfast.

While waiting in line for breakfast Spencer complains the whole time that it is taking too long to serve the food; he insists on having fried eggs instead of scrambled but his request is denied by the incompetent and dry camp employee, and Aaron and Brent are only given prunes and Tang for breakfast as the camp ran out of other food.

Spencer continues to complain about the food and tents. While the other fathers and their sons are amused and laugh at his joking complaints, Chet becomes annoyed and tells Spencer and Aaron they should leave camp if they dislike it so much. Spencer insists he doesn’t want to leave and tells Chet he is just joking and feels humor is good for everyone. Chet tells Spencer and Aaron that his son Chip always looks forward to attending camp and that he doesn’t want Chip’s weekend ruined because they cannot tolerate being inconvenienced. Spencer fires back and makes a joke to Chet about Desert Storm. Chet is offended and tells Spencer he will be watching him for the weekend. Spencer dismisses this as a non-threatening joke, although Brent tells Michael that he feels Chet will want to fight Spencer.

The Scoutmaster starts the day with announcements while Spencer continues to annoy Chet with his jokes. The first activity of the day is archery. Chet and Chip dominate the archery competition by bringing their own specialized bows and arrows, while the other campers receive lesser quality equipment.

The other dads and their sons, as well as Michael all ace archery, but Spencer fails due to his lack of practice and trying to teach Michael useless methods to archery.

Later is a competition in which the fathers and sons participate in a race where they run with an egg on a spoon to the end point in which the object is not to break the egg, followed by a potato sack race. Chet and Chip win the race.

Spencer and Michael then take a canoe around the island. Despite their best effort to paddle, the Paley’s break and destroy the canoe and Spencer is required to pay $400 for the damage.

This is followed by a hike into an abandoned silver mine on the island. Spencer suffers from claustrophobia and passes out while in the mine. The Scoutmaster and Aaron bring him to First Aid.

The next activity is water sports. Michael sees Chet and Chip wearing Scuba diving gear while Spencer and Michael fail to snorkel due to the muddy condition of the water. Michael says he has an interest in Scuba diving.

Spencer goes on the beach and tells Aaron he feels the camping trip was designed to prove to fathers how lousy of an example they are to their sons. In frustration he throws a stone into the water. The Scoutmaster gave specific instructions to the campers earlier to not throw stones in the water because the beach should be preserved to its natural state.

The Scoutmaster requests Spencer to retrieve the stone he threw in the water and return it to the beach or he will have Spencer and Michael escorted off the beach by the harbor patrol. Spencer attempts to honor his request sarcastically but is stung in the foot by a jellyfish and the Scoutmaster forces everyone to evacuate the water.

The Scoutmaster forces Spencer to go to first aid to heal his sting, and says the next activity is a basketball competition. He requests Spencer stay off his foot but Spencer ignores his warnings and wants to participate as well as win the competition with Michael.

The Paleys do a competition with the Johansens. The Johansens take the lead against the Paleys at first because Spencer insists he shoots the baskets while Michael passes him the ball. The plan fails and Brent encourages Michael to take lead of the ball and shoot the hoops ignoring what Spencer says. The Paleys then briefly take the lead, but Michael is injured in the ribs by Chip. The Scoutmaster calls a personal foul on the Johansen’s and Spencer tells Michael they will win or die trying. This encourages Michael to finish the game and the Paleys beat the Johansen’s by one point.

At night the Scoutmaster leads the camp in camp songs. The Scoutmaster attempts to give a speech but the campers find him boring and insist Spencer give the speech instead because they think he is funny.

Spencer tells the Scoutmaster he just needs to loosen up and relax, and has him remove his uniform to which the other campers respond favorably, and wish to hear his speech.

The Scoutmaster gives an inspirational speech about camping trips with his dad growing up and says it’s not about the competitions, but the point of the trip is to get fathers and sons closer and have a stronger bond. Encouraged, Spencer confesses he is having a good time and the Scoutmaster informs the camp there is a treasure hunt the following morning and dismisses the camp to sleep for the evening.

Feeling in the camping spirit Spencer and Michael return to their tent but find it has been trashed. Aaron tells him it could have either been a wild animal or good natured hazing but Spencer sees Chet sitting next to his tent looking at him with contempt.

Despite protests from Aaron and Michael Spencer confronts Chet about the tent as he knows Chet trashed it because he dislikes him. Chet tries to deceitfully avoid confrontation by telling Spencer it is a tradition that first time camp visitors get their tents trashed by another camper. Spencer informs Chet that if he has a problem with him to discuss it with him and not ruin his son’s camping experience. He calls Chet a coward for letting out his anger on Michael.

Chet gets in Spencer’s face. Spencer pushes him out of the way and Chet retaliates by getting into a fistfight with him, with Spencer getting a bloody nose Aaron tries to stop the fight but the Scoutmaster witnesses it and says fighting will not be tolerated and breaks up Spencer and Chet.

Michael runs away in embarrassment because of the fight and the Scoutmaster takes Spencer to first aid again to treat his nose while Aaron agrees to keep an eye on Michael in the meanwhile. The Scoutmaster requests Spencer not return to the camping trip the following year as the camp cannot financially afford to pay for his injuries.

The tent is restored and Spencer talks to Michael and suggests activities for the following day but Michael is humiliated and although the weekend is coming to a close he angrily insists to Spencer that they go home early the next morning.

Spencer calls the water taxi that took him to the camp earlier honoring Michael’s request but he realizes he has failed Michael as a father and has a responsibility to raise him to be a man. He then requests Michael to finish out the weekend with him and Michael eventually agrees. Spencer tells the water taxi navigator to go ahead without them, and Spencer agrees to participate in the treasure hunt with Michael.

Michael finds the path to the treasure and he and Spencer are the first to claim it. It turns out it is gold wrapped chocolate coins. Chet and Chip arrive to take the treasure away but Spencer insists they found it first. Chip attacks Michael and Chet engages Spencer in another fight.

Spencer and Chet fall into a wooden hole which beneath is a bottomless cavern. Michael and Chip stop fighting to check on their dads but they also fall through the hole. Chet’s foot is stuck and he insists they have very little time if they want to live, so Spencer relieves Chet of being stuck.

Chet goes back up to the mine with Spencer guiding him and the kids to safety so they can get out of the cavern.  Chet is then able to get Michael, Chip and Spencer out of the hole. Chet acknowledges that Spencer saved Chip’s life and thanks him.

The Paleys are then named the winners of the treasure hunt and their names will be put on a plaque to be displayed in the school auditorium. In addition for saving Chet and the kids lives the Paleys are awarded bravery medals by the Scoutmaster for good acts of service to their fellow campers. All of the dad and sons including Chet applaud Spencer and Michael.

Spencer and Chet reconcile with a handshake, with Chet telling Spencer even though he has the personality of a wimp, he can see Spencer in fact is not and is brave. Spencer initially attempts to respond sarcastically but refrains and tells Chet he understands why the trip was so important to him and that it is now just as important to him and Michael to which Chet says he is glad Spencer has come to this realization. Spencer makes a joking complaint about the camp’s scrambled eggs and he, Aaron and Chet share a final laugh before returning home.

Upon returning home Michael tells Donna about the events of the weekend but she doesn’t believe either her husband or son. Michael is disappointed he cannot convince his mother but Spencer reminds him that they know what really happened and to be happy for what they accomplished. Michael is then sent to bed happy because of his weekend experience. Spencer thanks Donna for making him go on the trip, and tells her he wants to do scuba diving and bungee jumping but Donna tells him to not get overwhelmed with new ideas because he goes overboard with them. She tells Spencer they will discuss more outdoor activities in the morning. Spencer smiles at the sight of his son sleeping and turns out the lights to his bedroom and the film ends.

Cast
 Bob Saget as Spencer Paley	
 Brian Bonsall as Michael Paley
 Heidi Swedberg as Donna Paley
 Stuart Pankin as Aaron Deutch	
 David Graf as Chet Johansen
 Troy Evans as Scoutmaster
 Denver Pyle as George Rosebrock
 Brian Levinson as Brent	
 Chachi Pittman as Chip Johansen
 Kimberly Scott as Francine	
 Ryan Holihan as Nolan #1
 Lucy Butler as Married Woman
 Robert Egan as Nolan #2
 Hassan Nicholas as Camper	
 Steven Kavne as Grandpa Paley	
 John Petlock as Doctor

Reception

TV Guide gave the film two out of five stars, concluding: "FATHER AND SCOUT is satisfactory family entertainment. The script has little to offer in the way of originality, but it is innocuous fun". The website Need Coffee gave the film a very bad review, stating: "If you have very small kids who don't know what a good movie is, they might like this. But why get them off on the wrong foot? Best to just turn and walk away."

References

External links

 
 

1994 television films
1994 films
American comedy television films
American Broadcasting Company original programming
Films about father–son relationships
Films scored by David Kitay
Sports television films
New Line Cinema films
Films directed by Richard Michaels
1990s American films
1990s English-language films
1990s sports comedy films
American sports comedy films